GRB 090423 was a gamma-ray burst (GRB) detected by the Swift Gamma-Ray Burst Mission on April 23, 2009 at 07:55:19 UTC whose afterglow was detected in the infrared and enabled astronomers to determine that its redshift is z = 8.2, which makes it one of the most distant objects detected to date with a spectroscopic redshift (GN-z11, discovered in 2016, has a redshift of 11).

A gamma-ray burst is an extremely luminous event flash of gamma rays that occurs as the result of an explosion, and is thought to be associated with the formation of a black hole. The burst itself typically only lasts for a few seconds, but gamma-ray bursts frequently produce an "afterglow" at longer wavelengths that can be observed for many hours or even days after the burst. Measurements at these wavelengths, which include X-ray, ultraviolet, optical, infrared, and radio, enable follow up study of the event.

The finite speed of light means that GRB 090423 is also one of the earliest objects ever detected for which a spectroscopic redshift has been measured. The universe was only 630 million years old when the light from GRB 090423 was emitted, and its detection confirms that massive stars were born and dying even very early on in the life of the universe. GRB 090423 and similar events provide a unique means of studying the early universe, as few other objects of that era are bright enough to be seen with today's telescopes.

Discovery and observation
On April 23, 2009, at 07:55:19 UTC the Swift satellite detected a burst that lasted about 10 seconds and was located in the direction of the constellation Leo.

Swift localized the field in which GRB 090423 occurred, and 77 seconds after the burst, the Swift UVOT Photometric System took a 150-second exposure of the field, but was unable to detect an optical or ultraviolet afterglow. A few minutes after its discovery, ground-based telescopes began observing the field. Within 20 minutes of the burst, Nial Tanvir and his team found an infrared source at the Swift position using the United Kingdom Infrared Telescope (UKIRT) on Mauna Kea, Hawaii. The initial observations taken by UKIRT were triggered autonomously via the eSTAR Project. They observed a drop off in flux beyond 1.13 micrometres with the VLT. Attributing this drop off to Lyman alpha absorption by neutral hydrogen in the intergalactic medium, they calculated a redshift of 8.2 for GRB 090423. The team of C.C. Thöne and Paolo D'Avanzo observed the afterglow of GRB 090423 using the Italian TNG 3.6m telescope located in the Canary Islands, Spain. They obtained two hours of spectra, which when combined, suggested a very weak signal at the position of the afterglow. They too saw a drop off in flux near 1.1 micrometres, and reported a redshift of 8.1 for GRB 090423, which is consistent, within error, of the redshift reported by Tanvir et al. The redshift of 8.1 suggest the burst may have lasted approximately 1.2 seconds in the local frame of the emitter, its duration being redshifted accordingly to the observed 10 seconds.  

The intergovernmental astronomy organisation, European Southern Observatory (ESO) operates the Very Large Telescope that obtained the spectrum reported by Tanvir et al. The GRB was not visible in Chile when Swift first detected the burst at 07:55 UTC, but was the following day at 03:00 UTC, which enabled the Gamma-Ray Burst Optical/Near-Infrared Detector (GROND) at La Silla Observatory to make observations of the burst, and find a photometric redshift consistent with the value reported elsewhere. The last observers to gather data during the event was the Combined Array for Research in Millimeter-wave Astronomy (CARMA) observatory. The observation of GRB 090423 by CARMA was taken at a frequency of 92.5 GHz. While the afterglow was not detected, they were able to place a 3-sigma upper limit of 0.7 mJy on the flux density of the afterglow.

Observation history

Significance
With a redshift of z = 8.2, at the time of observation, the burst was the most distant known object of any kind with a spectroscopic redshift. GRB 090423 was also the oldest known object in the Universe, apart from the Methuselah star. As the light from the burst took approximately 13 billion years to reach Earth. Another gamma-ray burst, GRB 090429B, was subsequently found to have a photometric redshift of 9.4, which surpasses that of GRB 090423, although the comparatively large error bars from the photometric redshift technique mean that the GRB 090429B result is much less certain. The burst occurred when the Universe was approximately one twentieth of its present age. Prior to the observations done on GRB 090423, the previous record holder for age and distance for GRBs was GRB 080913, which was observed in September 2008. That burst had a redshift of 6.7, placing it approximately 190 million light-years closer to Earth than GRB 090423. Derek Fox, who led the observations done by Pennsylvania State University, suggests that the GRB was most likely the result of the explosion of a massive star and its demise, which would probably have signalled the birth of a black hole. The event occurred roughly 630 million years after the Big Bang, confirming that massive stellar births (and deaths) did indeed occur in the very early Universe. When the burst occurred it was 3.3 billion ly away from our position, but due to the expansion of the universe and the movement of galaxies, the originating galaxy is now 30 billion ly away.

Joshua Bloom of the University of California, Berkeley, who was able to observe the location of the GRB at the Gemini South telescope in Chile, called the discovery of GRB 090423 a "watershed event" as it marked "the beginning of the study of the universe as it was before most of the structure that we know about today came into being." Nial Tanvir, who was part of the VLT team, suggests that gamma-ray bursts provide a unique tool to study the universe at early times because everything else is too faint to be observed. For instance, the first generation of stars have yet to be directly observed, but the progenitor of GRB 090423 may belong to this class. These early stars are expected to contribute to the reionisation of the universe, a process which ended at a redshift of about 6. As more powerful telescopes begin operation, such as the James Webb Space Telescope, launched in December 2021, astronomers hope to pinpoint the locations of faint GRB host galaxies by observing blasts similar to that of GRB 090423.

See also 
 List of the most distant astronomical objects

References

External links
Video of GRB 090423 on Youtube
Slashdot article "Most Distant Object Yet Detected, Bagged By Galileo Scope"
Swift Mission at NASA/Goddard Space Flight Center
GRB 090423 on WikiSky

20090423
090423
April 2009 events
Leo (constellation)